The 1983 Sacramento State Hornets football team represented California State University, Sacramento as a member of the Northern California Athletic Conference (NCAC) during the 1983 NCAA Division II football season. Led by sixth-year head coach Bob Mattos, Sacramento State compiled an overall record of 5–5–1 with a mark of 4–1–1 in conference play, placing second in the NCAC. The team outscored its opponents 258 to 245 for the season. The Hornets played home games at Hornet Stadium in Sacramento, California.

Schedule

Team players in the NFL
The following Sacramento State players were selected in the 1984 NFL Draft.

References

Sacramento State
Sacramento State Hornets football seasons
Sacramento State Hornets football